The Pearl-class cruiser was a third-class protected cruiser designed by Sir William White for the Royal Navy. Nine ships were built to this design, five of which were paid for by Australia under the terms of the Imperial Defence Act of 1887 to serve in Australian waters.

Design

Ships

References 

Battleships-cruisers.co.uk: Pearl-class

External links

 

Cruiser classes
 
Ship classes of the Royal Navy